Lual Mayen   is a South Sudanese video game developer and video game designer. He was born at the Aswa refugee camp in Sudan.  
In 1993, his family relocated to a refugee camp in Uganda. He was born into a family of seven.

Career
Mayen is known for creating Junub Games. During The Game Awards 2019 in Los Angeles, Mayen announced the video game Salaam.

Video games
His first game Salaam ("Peace"; 2018) is about protecting communities. It was premiered on 13 December 2019 at the Game Awards 2019.

Publications
"Wahda", a boardgame.

Honors
Global Gaming Citizen at 2018 Game Awards, Los Angeles.
CNN Champions for Change 2020.

References

External links 
 Mayen biography
Lual Mayen talks Peacebuilding and Conflict Resolution through Gaming
https://www.washingtonpost.com/washington-post-live/2020/02/07/transcript-power-play-video-games-esports/
South Sudan in Focus | Voice of America - English
How this man is using video games to help refugees

Video game designers
Living people
1993 births
The Game Awards winners